Jamal Khwaja (or, Ahmad Jamal Yusuf Khwaja, 12 August 1926 – 25 December 2020) was an Indian philosopher.

The philosophical work of Khwaja has two facets: an analysis of the nature and causes of philosophical disagreement, and second, analysis of the religious dimension of life, with special reference to Islam. Jamal Khwaja's basic approach to philosophy and religion was irenic rather than polemical.

Family background
Khwaja was born on 12 August 1926 in Delhi, India in his maternal grandmother's house. His father Abdul Majeed Khwaja (1885–1962) was a prominent lawyer and educationist and was involved in the Indian Freedom Movement under the leadership of Mahatma Gandhi. His grandfather Khwaja Muhammad Yusuf (d. 1902) was a prominent landowner and lawyer hailing from Aligarh (formerly known as Allygurh & Koil).
 
Aligarh is situated in the central doab (tract of land lying between two confluent rivers) region of Uttar Pradesh and has played a prominent role in the history of the region. In medieval times, the famous traveller Ibn Batuta almost lost his life in Koil. Lord Lake captured the famous Aligarh Fort from the Scindia, after fighting the decisive Battle of Aligarh in 1804.

In 1919 Abdul Majeed Khwaja gave up his flourishing legal practice at the Patna High Court in response to Mahatma Gandhi's call for non-co-operation with the colonial British Government. He was a prominent activist in both the Khilafat and the broader Indian struggle for independence. A.M. Khwaja was one of the founding fathers of the Jamia Millia Islamia along with Maulana Muhammad Ali, Mahatma Gandhi, Hakim Ajmal Khan and others.

His grandfather, Khwaja Muhammad Yusuf was one of the earliest supporters of the Aligarh Movement under the leadership of Sir Syed Ahmad Khan, the founder of Muhammadan Anglo-Oriental College. He donated large sums to the College Fund Committee and also toured the country along with Zahoor Hussain, and Zainul Abdeen. Also accompanying the group were the much younger duo of Syed Mahmood, son of Sir Syed and Hamied Ullah Khan, son of Maulvi Sami Ullah Khan to raise funds for the proposed MAO College. He was also very active in the affairs of the Scientific Society founded earlier in 1864 by Sir Syed.

His mother's name was Begum Khursheed Khwaja. She was the eldest daughter of Muhammad Hamied Ullah (later Nawab Sarbuland Jung) (17 March 1864 – 1930) the eldest surviving son of Maulvi Sami Ullah.

Hamied Ullah was the first to be enrolled as a student of the Muhammadan Anglo-Oriental College and was the second member of the larger family of Sir Syed and Maulvi Sami Ullah to proceed to Christ's College, Cambridge, University of Cambridge in England for higher studies. The first was Sir Syed's son, Syed Mahmood, who became the first ever-Indian judge of the Allahabad High Court. Hamied Ullah eventually became Chief Justice of the Nizam's High Court at Hyderabad with the title Nawab Sarbuland Jung.

Sir Syed and the much younger Maulvi Sami Ullah (17 years old at the time)  were relatives and close comrades. The courage, which Maulvi Sami Ullah displayed in rescuing Syed Ahmed's family from Delhi in the aftermath of the great Indian Rebellion of 1857, left a deep impression on the latter. But differences arose between the two due to some personal reasons as well as some policy matters relating to the affairs of the Muhammadan Anglo-Oriental College. The friends became estranged in the late 1880s. Maulvi Sami Ullah withdrew himself from Aligarh affairs and made Allahabad the focus of his educational mission through founding of the Muslim Boarding House as part of the famous University of Allahabad.

Education
Soon after the birth of Jamal Khwaja, his father moved to Allahabad, and resumed his legal practice at the Allahabad High Court. Jamal Khwaja's earliest schooling took place in Saint Mary's Convent, Allahabad. He learnt the Quran as well as the Persian language in the traditional manner, at home, from the accomplished scholar Maulvi Haidry. Later he joined the prestigious Government Intermediate College, Allahabad.

In 1942 his father, Abdul Majeed Khwaja had a serious heart attack. In 1943 the family moved back to the ancestral home at Aligarh, where Jamal Khwaja joined the Aligarh Muslim University, formerly the Muhammadan Anglo-Oriental College where many of his family members had attended or taught.

After completing his M.A. in Philosophy from the Aligarh Muslim University, Jamal Khwaja obtained an honours degree from his father's old alma mater, Christ's College at the University of Cambridge, in England. Later he spent a year studying the German language and European existentialism at the University of Münster, in Germany.

At Cambridge University he was deeply influenced by the work of C.D. Broad, Wittgenstein and John Wisdom and his college tutor, Ian Ramsey who later became Professor of Christian Religion at Oxford University and subsequently Bishop of Durham. It was Ramsey's influence that taught Khwaja to appreciate the inner beauty and power of pure spirituality. At Cambridge he also came to appreciate the value of linguistic analysis as a tool of philosophical inquiry and to combine the quest for clarity with the insights and depth of the existentialist approach to religion and spirituality.

Career
In 1953 Jamal Khwaja was appointed lecturer in Philosophy at his alma mater, Aligarh Muslim University (AMU).

Before he could immerse himself in serious academic work, his family tradition of public work pulled him into a brief spell of active politics under Jawaharlal Nehru: his father's contemporary at Cambridge University and the first Prime Minister of India. Nehru was keen to rejuvenate his team of colleagues by inducting fresh blood into the Indian National Congress. Jamal Khwaja was one of the young persons he chose. He thus became one of the youngest entrants into the Indian Parliament as an elected member of the Lok Sabha from 1957 to 1962.

During his time in politics, he learned to distinguish between ideals and illusions, and chose to continue to pursue academia instead of becoming more involved in the political world. Returning to his alma mater in 1962, he resumed teaching and research in the Philosophy of Religion. Since then Khwaja has lived a quiet life at Aligarh.

He was Dean of the Faculty of Arts and was a member of important committees of the University Grants Commission and the Indian Council for Philosophical Research before retiring as Professor and Chairman of the Department of Philosophy in 1988. He frequently and actively participated in national seminars at the Indian Institute of Advanced Study, Shimla.

Summary of general accomplishments

 Member of Parliament (Lok Sabha), 1957–62.
 Delivered the Schopenhauer Centenary Lecture at Max Mueller Bhawan, New Delhi, 1959–60.
 Member, Central Advisory Board of Anthropology, 1959–62.
 Joint Secretary, Hindustani Culture Society, founded by Pandit Sunder Lal, Tej Bahadur Sapru, A.M. Khwaja et al., 1964–69.
 Member, Government of India Delegation to the International Islamic Conference, Kuala Lumpur, Malaysia in 1969.
 Member, University Grants Commission Panel on Philosophy and of Visiting Committee to University of Mumbai (60), 1978–82.
 Head of the Department of Philosophy, Aligarh Muslim University, Aligarh, 1978–84.
 Dean, Faculty of Arts and Ex-Officio Member of the Executive Council, Aligarh Muslim University, 1980–82.
 Member of the Governing Body of the Indian Council for Philosophical Research, New Delhi, 1984.
 Governor's Nominee on the Senate of Himachal University, Shimla.
 Member, Editorial Board, Indian Philosophical Quarterly, Pune.

Works

His major works include Five Approaches to Philosophy, Quest for Islam, and Authenticity and Islamic Liberalism. His autobiography, The Vision of An Unknown Indian is slated for publication in 2011.

He is also the author of numerous scholarly articles and essays.

His work is dominated by the passionate quest to answer two questions: "What does it mean to be an authentic Muslim?" and secondly, how should a believer understand and interpret the 'Word of God' in our times?"

His first work, Five Approaches to Philosophy, is an analysis of the nature and causes of philosophical disagreement, while his second, principal work, Quest for Islam, analyses the religious dimension of life.

Jamal Khwaja's basic approach to philosophy and religion was irenic rather than polemical, and he attempted to transcend the traditional polarities of Rationalism and Empiricism, Idealism and Materialism, Theism and Atheism. This irenic approach flows from a critical methodology of philosophy.

Major conferences and lectures

 Leader of the Government of India Cultural Delegation to Afghanistan, 1960.
 He was one of the official Indian delegates at the Pakistan Philosophical Congress held at Peshawar in April 1963.
 He was one of the official Indian delegates at the International Islamic Conference Kuala Lumpur, Malaysia in 1967.
 He was invited to present a series of three memorial lectures at the Khuda Bakhsh Oriental Library, Patna during the mid 1980s.
 Participated in the seminar: The Concept and Role of Tolerance in Indian Culture, organised by the Center of Advance Study in Philosophy, Madras, 1985.
 Director, Philosophical Dialogue between Ulema and Modern Scholars, sponsored by Indian Council for Philosophical Research, New Delhi, 1988.
 He was one of the official Indian delegates at the World Philosophical Congress Brighton, United Kingdom (1988).
 He frequently and actively participated in national seminars at the Indian Institute of Advanced Study, Shimla. (57)

Personal life
In 1949 he married his cousin Hamida, the daughter of General Muhammad Akbar Khan and Qudsia Begum. They had three sons, Jawahar Kabir, Rajen Habib, Nasser Navin and one daughter, Geeta Anjum. He visited the US and several countries in Western Europe. He performed Hajj in 2005.

See also
Christ's College, Cambridge
Irfan Habib
Khwaja Abdul Hamied
Waheed Akhtar

Notes

References

Further reading

 The Early Life of the First Student of the M.A.O. College, A.M. Khwaja, The Allahabad Law Journal Press, Allahabad, 1916.
 My Life, Being The Autobiography of Nawab Server-Ul-Mulk Bahadur, English translation by his son Nawab Jiwan Yar Jung Bahadur, Publisher; Arthur H. Stockwell Limited, London.
 Muslims and India's Freedom Movement, Shan Muhammad, Institute of Objective Studies, New Delhi, 2002.
 The Indian Muslims, M.Mujeeb, Munshiram Manoharlal Publishers Pvt. Ltd., New Delhi, 1955.
 The Discovery of India, Jawaharlal Nehru, Oxford University Press, New Delhi.
 Sir Sayyid Ahmad Khan & Muslim Modernization in India & Pakistan, Hafeez Malik, Royal Book Company, Karachi, 1988.
 Towards a Common Destiny: A Nationalist Manifesto, Tufail Ahmad Manglori, People's Publishing House, New Delhi, 1994.
 Hayat-i-Javed, Altaf Husain Hali, Idarah-i-Adabiyat-i-Delhi, Delhi, 1979
 Aligarh's First Generation, David Lelyveld, Oxford University Press. Delhi, 1996.
 Sir Syed Ahmad Khan – A Reinterpretation of Muslim Theology, C.W.Troll, Oxford University Press, Karachi.
 Sir Syed Ahmed Khan – A political Biography, Shan Muhammad, Meenakshi Prakashan, Meerut.
 The Aligarh Movement – Basic Documents, Shan Muhammad, Meenakshi Prakashan, Meerut.
 History of The Aligarh Muslim University, Khaliq Ahmad Nizami, Idarah -i- Adbiyat –i- Delli, Delhi, 1995.
 An Autobiography – A life to Remember, K.A. Hamied, Lalvani Publishing House, Bombay, 1972.
 Enlightenment and Islam: Sayyid Ahmad Khan’s Plea to Indian Muslims for Reason.
 The Aligarh Movement and the Making of the Indian Muslim Mind 1857–2002, Tariq Hasan, Published 2006 by Rupa & Co., New Delhi.

External links
 www.JamalKhwaja.com (Author's official website)
www.AlhamdPublishers.com (Publishers of 7 works of Khwaja Sahab)
 Christ’s College celebrates opening of the Khwaja Yusuf Hamied Centre
archive.org/details/mylifebeingtheau031135mbp

2020 deaths
20th-century Indian philosophers
India MPs 1957–1962
Indian Muslims
Academic staff of Aligarh Muslim University
Islamic philosophers
Alumni of Christ's College, Cambridge
Indian National Congress politicians
Aligarh Muslim University alumni
1926 births
Lok Sabha members from Uttar Pradesh